Dawson County is a county in the U.S. state of Texas. As of the 2020 census, its population was 12,456. The county seat is Lamesa. The county was created in 1876 and later organized in 1905. It is named for Nicholas Mosby Dawson, a soldier of the Texas Revolution. Dawson County comprises the Lamesa, TX Micropolitan Statistical Area (μSA), and it is the smallest Micropolitan Statistical Area in the United States.

History
A Dawson County was founded in 1856 from Kinney County, Maverick County and Uvalde County, but was divided in 1866 between Kinney County and Uvalde County. The current Dawson County was founded in 1876.

In 1943, the discovery well for the Spraberry Trend, the third-largest oil field in the United States by remaining reserves, was drilled in Dawson County on land owned by farmer Abner Spraberry, for whom the geological formation and associated field were named. While most of the oil fields are in the counties to the south, a small portion of the Spraberry Trend is in Dawson County. Production on the field did not begin until 1949, and by 1951, an oil boom was underway in the area, with Midland at its center.

Like all Texas counties as stipulated in the Texas Constitution of 1876, Dawson County has four commissioners chosen by single-member district and a countywide-elected county judge, the chief administrator of the county.

James Edward "J. E." Airhart, Sr. (1915-2007), served for 30 years from 1935 to 1985 on the Dawson County Commissioners Court, in which capacity he  worked to obtain the county livestock and fair barn, the general aviation airport, and numerous highway improvements. He was instrumental in the successful negotiation of rights-of-way for U.S. Highway 87 north to O'Donnell and south to Ackerly. A farmer and rancher, Airhart also served on the board of the Klondike Independent School District and was a Baptist deacon.
J. E. "Jimmy" Airhart, Jr. (1935-2016), the oldest of Airhart's six children, was a farmer/rancher and educator, who was superintendent of the Dawson County Independent School District. Donald Ray Airhart (1937-2017) was a cattleman in Dawson County who like his father, served on the Klondike School Board and worked with youth in stock shows and other agricultural pursuits.

Geography

Major highways
  U.S. Highway 87
  U.S. Highway 180
  State Highway 83
  State Highway 137

Adjacent counties
 Lynn County (north)
 Borden County (east)
 Howard County (southeast)
 Martin County (south)
 Gaines County (west)
 Terry County  (northwest)

Demographics

Note: the US Census treats Hispanic/Latino as an ethnic category. This table excludes Latinos from the racial categories and assigns them to a separate category. Hispanics/Latinos can be of any race.

As of the census of 2000, 14,985 people, 4,726 households, and 3,501 families resided in the county.  The population density was 17 people per square mile (6/km2).  There were 5,500 housing units at an average density of 6 per square mile (2/km2).  The racial makeup of the county was 72.47% White, 8.66% Black or African American, 0.30% Native American, 0.25% Asian, 16.56% from other races, and 1.77% from two or more races. About 48.19% of the population were Hispanic or Latino of any race.

Of the 4,726 households, 35.10% had children under the age of 18 living with them, 59.40% were married couples living together, 11.00% had a female householder with no husband present, and 25.90% were not families. About 23.90% of all households were made up of individuals, and 13.30% had someone living alone who was 65 years of age or older.  The average household size was 2.69 and the average family size was 3.20.

In the county, the population was distributed as 25.60% under the age of 18, 8.90% from 18 to 24, 30.70% from 25 to 44, 20.50% from 45 to 64, and 14.30% who were 65 years of age or older.  The median age was 36 years. For every 100 females, there were 124.30 males.  For every 100 females age 18 and over, there were 129.90 males.

The median income for a household in the county was $28,211, and for a family was $32,745. Males had a median income of $27,259 versus $16,739 for females. The per capita income for the county was $15,011.  About 16.40% of families and 19.70% of the population were below the poverty line, including 29.20% of those under age 18 and 12.80% of those age 65 or over.

Communities

Cities
 Ackerly (partly in Martin County)
 Lamesa (county seat)
 Los Ybanez
 O'Donnell (mostly in Lynn County)

Census-designated place
 Welch

Unincorporated communities
 Klondike
 Patricia

Politics

Education
School districts serving the county include:
 Dawson Independent School District
 Klondike Independent School District
 Lamesa Independent School District
 O'Donnell Independent School District
 Sands Consolidated Independent School District

The county is in the service area of Howard County Junior College.

See also

 Dry counties
 National Register of Historic Places listings in Dawson County, Texas
 Recorded Texas Historic Landmarks in Dawson County

References

External links
 Dawson County government’s website
 Dawson County in Handbook of Texas Online at the University of Texas
 TXGenWeb Project for Dawson County
 Dawson County History at HistoricTexas.net

 
1905 establishments in Texas
Populated places established in 1905
Majority-minority counties in Texas